Royal Blood is a 1916 American silent comedy film starring Oliver Hardy.

Plot
Mrs Vandergrift wants her daughter to marry a count. However, in spite of mother's best efforts, the daughter is in love with Plump. To win over Mrs Vandergrift, Plump and his pal Runt dress up in fancy clothes and pose as members of society. Their efforts to appear distinguished fail miserably and the count arrives on the scene to complicate matters. But in the end, Mrs. Vandergrift changes her mind anyway, and she gives Plump and her daughter her blessings.

Cast
 Oliver Hardy - Plump (as Babe Hardy)
 Billy Ruge - Runt
 Edna Reynolds - Mrs. Vandergrift
 Ray Godfrey - Her daughter
 Bert Tracy - The Count
 Florence McLaughlin

See also
 List of American films of 1916
 Oliver Hardy filmography

References

External links

1916 films
1916 comedy films
1916 short films
American silent short films
American black-and-white films
Silent American comedy films
American comedy short films
1910s American films